Prunus microphylla is a species of Prunus found in the semi-arid regions of Mexico, able to thrive in areas that receive only 300 to 500mm of rain annually. Judging from its morphology, it is most closely related to Prunus minutiflora. As its specific epithet suggests, its leaves are quite small, only 1 to 1.5cm long. It is a dense shrub reaching about 1m, with small white flowers. It was first described by Kunth as Amygdalus microphylla from the collections made by Humboldt during his voyage to the Americas from 1799 to 1804.

References

microphylla
Endemic flora of Mexico
Flora of Northeastern Mexico
Flora of Central Mexico
Flora of Southwestern Mexico
Flora of Veracruz
Plants described in 1880
Drought-tolerant plants